USS K-7 (SS-34) was a K-class submarine built for the United States Navy during the 1910s.

Description
They displaced  on the surface and  submerged. The K-class submarines had a crew of 2 officers and 26 enlisted men.

For surface running, the boats were powered by two  NELSECO diesel engines, each driving one propeller shaft. When submerged each propeller was driven by a  electric motor. They could reach  on the surface and  underwater.

The K-class submarines were armed with four 18-inch (450 mm)  torpedo tubes in the bow. They carried four reloads, for a total of eight torpedoes.

Construction and career
The boat was laid down by the Union Iron Works at San Francisco, California, under a subcontract from Electric Boat Company of Groton, Connecticut.  She was launched on 20 June 1914, sponsored by Mrs.  Katie-Bel McGregor, daughter of the president of Union Iron Works, and commissioned at Mare Island on 1 December.

As a unit of the Pacific Torpedo Flotilla, K-7 sailed for San Diego, California, on 26 December, arriving 28 December to commence shakedown and training along the California coast. She returned to San Francisco 4 June 1915, then departed 3 October for experimental duty in the Hawaiian Islands.  Arriving at Pearl Harbor on 14 October, she conducted torpedo and diving tests and participated in operations developing the tactics of submarine warfare. K-7 departed Pearl Harbor 31 October 1917, and sailed via the West Coast and the Panama Canal for antisubmarine patrol duty in the Gulf of Mexico.

Arriving at Key West, Florida, on 8 January 1918, K-7 patrolled the shipping lanes of the Gulf of Mexico from the Florida Keys to Galveston Bay. She returned to Key West from Galveston, Texas, on 27 November and resumed training and development operations until departing for Philadelphia Navy Yard on 14 April 1919. She received an overhaul from 21 April to 10 November, then resumed operations out of Key West in the Caribbean Sea. Following additional overhaul during the latter half of 1921, K-7 resumed her training and development operations at the United States Naval Academy on 19 January 1921.

For more than two years, she ranged the eastern seaboard from Hampton Roads, Virginia, to Provincetown, Massachusetts, training submariners, conducting diving experiments, and practicing underwater warfare tactics. During April and May 1921, she visited the Naval Academy at Annapolis, Maryland and the United States Military Academy at West Point, New York.  After conducting almost seven months of submarine instructions at New London, Connecticut, she arrived at Hampton Roads on 7 September 1922 for submarine flotilla operations in Chesapeake Bay.  Subsequently, K-7 decommissioned at Hampton Roads on 12 February 1923. She was towed to Philadelphia on 23 August 1924, struck from the Naval Vessel Register on 18 December 1930, and sold for scrap on 3 June 1931.

Notes

References

External links
 

United States K-class submarines
World War I submarines of the United States
Ships built in San Francisco
1914 ships
Ships built by Union Iron Works